Julliet Toney (born 13 November 1970) is an English karateka.  She is the winner of multiple European Karate Championships and World Karate Championships Karate medals. Her twin sister is Jillian Toney.

References

1970 births
Living people
Black British sportswomen
British identical twins
English twins
Twin sportspeople
English female karateka
World Games gold medalists
Competitors at the 1993 World Games